Brooklyn Center High School is a public high school located in Brooklyn Center, Minnesota.

School overview 
Brooklyn Center High School is the only high school serving ISD #286, and has approximately 850 students in grades 6–12. One of the highest in the state, BCHS' open enrollment percentage is 33%. District 286 is the smallest district in the state of Minnesota in terms of geographical size. Family is the main goal and strategy at this school. Its athletics teams compete in the Tri-Metro Conference.  It was previously a founding member of the Metro Alliance. In 1982 Brooklyn Center won the inaugural Minnesota State Class A football championship. The school also participates in the University of Minnesota's College in the Schools program.

Notable alumni 
 Marcus Harris, Fred Biletnikoff award winner as a receiver at University of Wyoming
 Justin “Judd” Jennrich, BCW Wrestling Promoter and former TCW World Champion BCW and TCW

References

External links 
BCHS school website
Brooklyn Center High School Band - Website
All of the BCHS choirs

Public high schools in Minnesota
Educational institutions established in 1961
Schools in Hennepin County, Minnesota
Public middle schools in Minnesota
1961 establishments in Minnesota